The 1996–97 Ukrainian Cup is the sixth annual edition of Ukraine's football knockout competition, known as the Ukrainian Cup.

This season for all amateur clubs was revived separate competition (Amateur Cup) that was discontinued back in 1989. No amateur clubs participated in the competition this season. Two legs rounds were revived for quarterfinals and semifinals. The Cup started with the round of 32, but it also had couple of preliminaries. The qualification rounds of competition started on 14 August 1996 with nine matches.

The cup holder Dynamo Kyiv was eliminated in away game against Nyva Vinnytsia losing on penalty kicks in the Round of 16.

Team allocation
Seventy three teams entered the competition

Distribution

Competition schedule

First preliminary round

Second preliminary round

Third preliminary round

First Elimination Round (1/16)

Second Elimination Round (1/8)

Quarterfinals (1/4)
In this round enter the four winners from the previous round. All the teams are from the Premier League.

|}

First leg

Second leg

Metalurh won 4–1 on aggregate.

Dnipro won 4–0 on aggregate.

CSKA won 3–1 on aggregate.

Shakhtar won 2–1 on aggregate.

Semifinals (1/2) 
In this round enter the four winners from the previous round. All the teams are from the Premier League.

|}

First leg

Second leg

Shakhtar won 5–1 on aggregate.

Dnipro won 3–2 on aggregate.

Final

The final was held at the NSC Olimpiysky on May 25, 1997, in Kyiv.

Top goalscorers

See also
1996–97 Vyshcha Liha

References

External links 
Calendar of Matches—Schedule of the Ukrainian Cup on the UkrSoccerHistory.com. 

Ukrainian Cup seasons
Cup
Ukrainian Cup